Alan Reynolds (born c. 1942) is one of the original supply-side economists.

He is Senior Fellow at the Cato Institute and was formerly Director of Economic Research at the Hudson Institute (1990–2000). He served as Research Director with National Commission on Tax Reform and Economic Growth (the Kemp Commission), advisor to the National Commission on the Cost of Higher Education, and member of the Office of Management and Budget transition team in 1981.

His studies have been published by the Organisation for Economic Co-operation and Development, the Joint Economic Committee, the Federal Reserve Banks of Atlanta and St. Louis and the Australian Stock Exchange. The latter paper was influential in the decision by the Australian government to cut the capital gains tax rate, in 1999.

Reynolds received his A.B. in economics from UCLA in 1965 and pursued graduate studies at night at California State University, Sacramento from 1967 to 1970.

He is the author of Income and Wealth (Greenwood Press 2006) and The Microsoft Antitrust Appeal (Hudson Institute 2001). He also wrote for numerous publications since 1971, including The Wall Street Journal, The New York Post, National Review, The New Republic, Fortune, The New York Times, The Washington Post, The Washington Times and The Harvard Business Review. Reynolds is a former columnist with Forbes, Reason and Creators Syndicate.

Bibliography

Books
 Microsoft Antitrust Appeal (Hudson Institute, 2001)
 After Enron: Lessons for Public Policy (Chapter 3, "Political Responses to the Enron Scandal," and Chapter 17, "Compensation, Journalism, and Taxes")
 Income and Wealth (Greenwood Press, 2006)

Articles and other contributions
 "What Do We Know About the Great Crash?", National Review (Sept 9, 1979)
 "National Prosperity is No Mystery", Orbis (Spring 1996)
 "Capital Gains Tax: Analysis of Reform Options for Australia", Australian Stock Exchange (July 1999)
 "Monetary Policy by Trial and Error," in The Supply-Side Revolution 20 Years Later, Joint Economic Committee, U.S. Congress (March 2000)
  "What Really Happened in 1981?", The Independent Journal (Fall 2000) (with Paul Craig Roberts)
 "The Conventional Hypothesis: Deficit Estimates, Savings Rates, Twin Deficits and Yield Curves", U.S. Treasury (2004)
 "The Top 1% of What?", The Wall Street Journal (December 15, 2006)
 "Income Inequality Claims Ring Hollow When Correctly Examined", Budget and Tax News (May 2007)

References

External links
 Podcasts of Reynolds' recent articles
 
 

American economists
University of California, Los Angeles alumni
Living people
Supply-side economists
Libertarian economists
American libertarians
1940s births
Year of birth missing (living people)
Cato Institute people
Hudson Institute